Tapasya College of Commerce and Management (TCCM) is an educational institute based in Hyderabad, Telangana, India.
The college is affiliated with Osmania University and approved by Government of Telangana and Telangana State Board of Intermediate Education.

History
Tapasya College of Commerce and Management (TCCM) was established in the year 2009 under the Osmania University and Telangana State Board of Intermediate Education based in Hyderabad, Telangana.

Academics
B.Com - 3 years full time graduation program available in commerce, business application, taxation and accounting. The courses are approved by Osmania University.
BBA - 3 years full time graduation program approved by Osmania University.
 Company Secretariat CS  - graduation program  in financial records, company policies, tax returns, business economics, and legal aspects,regulated by ICSI (Institute of Company Secretaries of India).
B.A. - 3 years full time graduation program available in Fashion Design.
  MEC - part of Intermediate program, affiliated to Telangana State Board of Intermediate Education
 CEC - part of Intermediate program, affiliated to Telangana State Board of Intermediate Education

References

Colleges in India
Colleges affiliated to Osmania University
Commerce colleges in India